Mohamed Laqouahi (born 16 March 1978) is a born Moroccan former Italian male long-distance runner, who won an Italian championships in 2013.

National titles
 Italian Athletics Championships
 10 km road: 2013

See also
 Naturalized athletes of Italy

References

External links
 

1978 births
Living people
Italian male long-distance runners
Moroccan emigrants to Italy
Naturalised citizens of Italy
Italian sportspeople of African descent
Italian male marathon runners
Sportspeople from Reggio Emilia